Moxnes is a surname. Notable people with the surname include:

Bjørnar Moxnes (born 1981), Norwegian politician
Einar Hole Moxnes (1921–2006), Norwegian politician
Halvor Moxnes (born 1944), Norwegian theologian

Norwegian-language surnames